Hitler's Folly is a 2016 American mockumentary directed, written, designed and animated by filmmaker Bill Plympton.

Plot
A satirical reimagining of the life and dreams of the Nazi dictator Adolf Hitler. The film explores Hitler's unfulfilled animation career, involving creating a Disneyland-like place called Nazi-land.

Cast
 Nate Steinwachs as Adolf Hitler
 Dana Ashbrook as Josh
 Michael Sullivan as Michael S.
 Kristin Samuelson as Gerte, German dancer
 Andreas Hykade as concentration camp survivor
 Morton Hall Millen as Advertising Executive
 David Shakopi as Chief of Police
 Kevin Kolack as Head of Forensics
 Edie Bales as Eva Braun
 Alfred Rosenblatt as Bijou Kino Cinema Owner
 Ari Taub as Nazi SS Soldier
 James Hancock as Nazi SS Soldier
 Bill Plympton as Interviewer

Production

External links

References
 "Bill Plympton to Release Satirical Hitler film
 Hitler's Folly

2016 films
Cultural depictions of Adolf Hitler
Films directed by Bill Plympton
American mockumentary films
2016 comedy films
2010s English-language films
2010s American films